Winterborne Stickland is a village and civil parish in the county of Dorset in southern England. In 2013 the civil parish had an estimated population of 520. In the 2011 census the parish, combined with the smaller neighbouring parishes of Winterborne Clenston to the south and Turnworth to the north, recorded a population of 653.

Winterborne Stickland is sited in a winterbourne valley in the Dorset Downs, which gives rise to the first part of its name. The second part "Stickland" is derived from sticol, Old English for "steep".

Blandford Forest is a scattered area of woodlands northwest of Blandford Forum that is located within a 10 km radius of Winterborne Stickland.

History 
The Domesday book records the canons of Coutances (St Mary), Normandy, as the tenant-in-chief in 1066 with no change by 1086, after the conquest.

The annual value to the lord was 15 pounds in 1086.  The 37 households place Winterborne Stickland in the largest 20% of settlements recorded.

The Church
The parish Church of St Mary is a Grade I listed building. The nave and chancel date from the thirteenth century, the tower from around 1500 and the south porch from the sixteenth century. Restoration work took place in 1892. The building is constructed of bands of stone and flint and there is a north tomb chamber. The tower is on the west end and is in two stages; it has diagonal buttresses, pinnacles and a parapet surrounded by battlements. The interior is plastered and whitewashed and has a possibly medieval ribbed wagon roof. The font, hexagonal pulpit and the panelling in the tomb chamber are eighteenth century. The screen between the chancel and tomb chamber may use parts of the fifteenth century rood screen. There are various seventeenth, eighteenth and nineteenth century monuments, and the table tomb in the tomb chamber is dedicated to Thomas and Barbara Skinner.

Amenities
To the north of the village is a children's playground, tennis court, football pitch and a clubhouse. The clubhouse is well known by locals for the 'Messy Games' which usually take place every summer and/or Christmas. In 2022, the children's playground was renovated with new wooden play equipment as the previous play equipment was too dangerous for use.

To the north of that is a small orchard of apple, pear and plum trees.

Many of the thatched cottages in the village are listed buildings.

There is a pub in the center of the village called The Crown (Previously called The Shire Horse) which is currently owned by Ringwood Brewery. In 2019, Marstons Breweries tried to purchase the pub from Ringwood Brewery but they were unsuccessful in their attempt. As of March 2022, the pub has been renovated with a new sign and the pub has been painted blue.

The village used to have a post office which had a shop selling local food and other products. This closed down around 2015 and has since moved into the Pamela Hambro Hall. The former shop premises is currently owned by Valley Fabrications and is used to store various items.

There also used to be another village store in Winterborne Stickland known as 'Stickland Stores'. It also closed down around the same time as the post office.

There is a MOT centre/garage in the village called 'Kevin's Garage' which used to sell petrol up until the late 1990s. This petrol station used to constantly change suppliers.

There also used to be another petrol station in the village. It used to only have one pump and sold Shell branded fuel.

There is a village hall in the village called the Pamela Hambro Hall. This hall is used often by the community and is known for its Artsreach shows.

Just outside the village is a small area with four office blocks surrounded by a farm house.

There used to be a school in the village called 'The Dunbury School'. Unfortunately, the school closed its doors in 2011 and sat abandoned and empty for many years. It was originally going to be transferred into another primary school baring a different name but this never happened. Around 2013–2014, students at other Dunbury School bases decided ro chose a name for the new nursery which would be in the old Stickland base. The name chosen was 'Stickleberries'. The new nursery opened in the old school premises around 2015-2016 and currently holds an after school club for Dunbury School students. The nursery is also surrounded by the village green.

The village green is a small area of greenery in Winterborne Stickland which contains the village sign, various benches and a river flowing in the center. The village sign was renovated and appeared in Season 2 Episode 7 of The Repair Shop in March 2018. This episode can currently be seen on TVNZ+ and is occasionally broadcast on Quest channel in the UK.

References

External links

Villages in Dorset